The Free National Movement (abbreviated FNM) is a political party in The Bahamas formed in the early 1970s, led by Sir Cecil Wallace Whitfield. The current leader of the party is Michael Pintard and his deputy Peter Turnquest. It dominated the general election held on 10 May 2017, winning 35 of the 39 seats in the Legislature, but was defeated in 2021, losing 28 seats.

History

The FNM was established at Jimmy Shepherd's house on Spring Hills Farms in Fox Hill in 1971. The Free-PLP were a breakaway group of eight MPs from the then governing Progressive Liberal Party. This group, which was known as the "Dissident Eight", included Cecil Wallace Whitfield, Arthur Foulkes, Warren J. Levarity, Maurice E. Moore, Curtis McMillan , James (Jimmy) Shepherd, Elwood Donaldson and George Thompson. Following meetings held at Spring Hill Farms, the FNM officially became a political party in October 1971, with Cecil Wallace Whitfield as its leader.

The other group, the UBP, was one of the main political parties in the Bahamas and had governed the country since the advent of party politics in 1958, until it lost the 1967 general election by a paper thin margin to the Opposition PLP.

The UBP party's leadership was predominantly white while blacks made up most of the citizenry. Once out of power, its leaders decided that the party's time was at an end and they looked to the Free-PLP to form a new party that would follow a conservative party line. The fusion was called the Free National Movement.

The party grew in part by uniting independent black voters and the old UBP voter base. However, these were heady days for the governing PLP, who led the country to independence in 1973, and the FNM failed to gain much more than 40% of the vote in a string of general elections defeats.

In 1990, Hubert Ingraham took over the leadership of the party after the death of Sir Cecil Wallace Whitfield. The FNM attacked the governing PLP on corruption charges and published a Manifesto.

In the general election of 1992, the FNM defeated its rival, the PLP, by wide margins, winning 32 of the then 49 seats. The FNM Government privatized the government-owned hotels, which had fallen into decline since nationalization. Private radio stations were allowed to operate, ending the government's broadcast monopoly. The FNM also introduced local government and encouraged inward investment to grow the economy. The elections of 1997 saw the FNM re-elected in a landslide, with 35 of the 40 seats in a reduced House.

After Ingraham vowed not to seek a third term in office, Tommy Turnquest was elected leader of the party.  The party then lost the 2002 elections. Many voters, including FNM supporters, felt that Turnquest was much "weaker" than Perry Christie, leader of the Progressive Liberal Party.

At the FNM's party convention the following the general elections of 2002, Ingraham was returned as leader of the Free National Movement. The FNM went on to regain control of the House of Assembly in the elections of 2007.

The FNM lost government to the Progressive Liberal Party once again in the 2012 Bahamian general elections; it dropped its total share of votes (obtaining only 42.1 percent of the vote, compared to 48.7 percent by the Progressive Liberal Party). The Progressives won 29 of the seats in the legislature and thus the government, compared to the FNM's 9. Ingraham subsequently resigned, both as party leader as well as the Member of Parliament for North Abaco, and announced his retirement from politics following the defeat. He had served in Parliament for 35 years, winning re-election seven times, including 2012. Ingraham told supporters, "I gave it the best I could and now I've been rejected by the public of the Bahamas... We had no indication from the general public they would go that way." Following this series of events the FNM went on to lose the by-election triggered by Ingraham's retirement held on 15 October 2012, reducing the total FNM seat count to 8 of the 38 seats in the House of Assembly. The FNM however went on to win the 2017 general election under the leadership of Hubert Minnis, gaining 35 seats out of 39 total.

In September 2021, Prime Minister Minnis called a snap election. The ruling Free National Movement lost to the opposition Progressive Liberal Party, as the twin challenges of COVID-19 and 2019's Hurricane Dorian left the Bahamian economy struggling to recover from its deepest crash since at least 1971. Progressive Liberal Party (PLP) won 32 of the 39 seats in the House of Assembly. Free National Movement (FNM), led by Minnis,  took the remaining seats. On 17 September 2021, the leader of the Progressive Liberal Party (PLP) Phillip “Brave” Davis was sworn in as the new Prime Minister of Bahamas to succeed Hubert Minnis.

Electoral results

References

External links
Official website

Political parties in the Bahamas
Political parties established in 1971
1971 establishments in the Bahamas